The 2022 Copa de la Liga Profesional Final was the final match of the 2022 Copa de la Liga Profesional, the third edition of this national cup. It was held in the Estadio Mario Alberto Kempes in Córdoba on 22 May 2022 between Boca Juniors and Tigre.

Unlike most of the Argentine football matches, supporters from both clubs were allowed to attend the Estadio Mario Alberto Kempes. It was expected near 60,000 people attended the match.

Boca Juniors won their second title after they defeated Tigre 3–0 in the final. As champions, Boca Juniors qualified for the 2023 Copa Libertadores and the 2022 Trofeo de Campeones.

Qualified teams

Road to the final 

Note: In all results below, the score of the finalist is given first (H: home; A: away; N: neutral venue).

Match details

Statistics

References

2022 in Argentine football
l
l